Pygarctia pterygostigma is a moth in the family Erebidae. It was described by Harrison Gray Dyar Jr. in 1909. It is found in Mexico, and in the United States, in New Mexico and southern Texas.

The wingspan is about 28 mm. Adults are on wing from June to September.

References

Arctiidae genus list at Butterflies and Moths of the World of the Natural History Museum

Moths described in 1909
Phaegopterina